William James Whipper (January 23, 1834 – July 29, 1907) was an  abolitionist, trial lawyer, municipal judge, and state legislator in South Carolina. An African American, he volunteered for the United States Army during the Civil War, serving from 1864 to November 1865 as a member of the 31st Colored Troops. He played an influential role in the state government of South Carolina during Reconstruction. As a delegate to the state's 1868 constitutional convention, he supported women's suffrage, although his motion to allow "every citizen" to vote was not taken seriously at the time. He was a noted political opponent of Robert Smalls as well as a dedicated trial lawyer.

Early life 
He was born in Norristown, Pennsylvania on January 23, 1834. Whipper's uncle William Whipper was a noted abolitionist and he was named after him. He moved to Ohio where he became a member of the  abolition movement. He studied law in Detroit.

Military service
Whipper volunteered for the United States Army during the Civil War, serving from 1864 to November 1865 as a member of the 31st Colored Troops. During his military service he was court-martialed once for gambling and once for insulting a white lieutenant.

Career
During his career as a trial lawyer, he once served as a co-counsel to Jonathan Jasper Wright, who later went on to become the first black judge of the Supreme Court of South Carolina. 

Whipper was elected as a delegate to the state constitutional convention in 1868 where he gave a speech in support of allowing women to vote but the delegates kept on interrupting him and his speech was decided in negative. With Robert Elliott and Macon B. Allen, Whipper formed the nation's first known African American law firm, Whipper, Elliott, and Allen.

He and John L. Mitchell represented barber George Brownfield who was convicted of murder by an all white jury in Georgetoen, South Carolina. 

He was sworn in as a member of the South Carolina House of Representatives in 1875.

Family life 

After the death of his first wife, Whipper married diarist Frances Anne Rollin in South Carolina. The couple had five children. Their daughter Ionia Rollin Whipper became a social reformer. As a result of marital discord, Frances separated from William during the early 1880s, taking her five children to Washington, D.C.

References

Bibliography

1834 births
1907 deaths
African-American people
Members of the South Carolina General Assembly
Trial lawyers
People of the Reconstruction Era
19th-century American politicians